Catch Thirtythree is the fifth studio album by Swedish extreme metal band Meshuggah. It was released on 16 May 2005 in Europe and on 31 May 2005 in North America, through Nuclear Blast. Catch Thirtythree entered the Billboard 200 chart at number 170.
The album is a single song, a continuous suite, with 13 movements. It exclusively used drum programming, leveraging Toontrack's Drumkit from Hell software synthesizer, instead of traditional acoustic drums.

Track listing

Personnel
 Jens Kidman – lead vocals, guitar, bass, drum programming, mixing
 Fredrik Thordendal – guitar, bass, drum programming, mixing
 Mårten Hagström – lyrics, guitar, bass, drum programming, mixing
 Tomas Haake – lyrics, vocals, drum programming, mixing, artwork and artwork concept
 Björn Engelmann – mastering (Cutting Room Studios)

Charts

References

Meshuggah albums
2005 albums
Nuclear Blast albums
Concept albums
Song cycles